Waldschmidt is a surname. Notable people with the surname include:

 Anne Waldschmidt (born 1958), German sociologist and professor at the University of Cologne.
 Britta Waldschmidt-Nelson (born 1965), German Associate Professor of American History and Culture
 Ernst Waldschmidt (1897, Lünen – 1985, Göttingen), German orientalist
 Henkie (Henki) Waldschmidt (born 1988, Den Haag), Dutch racing driver
 Luca Waldschmidt (born 1996), German footballer
 Michel Waldschmidt (born 1946), French mathematician
 Paul E. Waldschmidt (1920–1994), American Roman Catholic bishop
 Stephen Waldschmidt, American-Canadian actor
 Waldschmidt Hall (originally: West Hall), an academic building at the University of Portland in Portland, Oregon

See also 
 Waldschmidt-Camp Dennison District

German-language surnames
Occupational surnames